

Events

Pre-1600
 313 – The decisions of the Edict of Milan, signed by Constantine the Great and co-emperor Valerius Licinius, granting religious freedom throughout the Roman Empire, are published in Nicomedia.
1325 – Ibn Battuta begins his travels, leaving his home in Tangiers to travel to Mecca (gone 24 years). 
1381 – In England, the Peasants' Revolt, led by Wat Tyler, comes to a head, as rebels set fire to the Savoy Palace.
1514 – Henry Grace à Dieu, at over 1,000 tons the largest warship in the world at this time, built at the new Woolwich Dockyard in England, is dedicated.
1525 – Martin Luther marries Katharina von Bora, against the celibacy rule decreed by the Roman Catholic Church for priests and nuns.

1601–1900
1625 – King Charles I of England marries Catholic princess Henrietta Maria of France and Navarre, at Canterbury.
1740 – Georgia provincial governor James Oglethorpe begins an unsuccessful attempt to take Spanish Florida during the Siege of St. Augustine.
1774 – Rhode Island becomes the first of Britain's North American colonies to ban the importation of slaves.
1777 – American Revolutionary War: Gilbert du Motier, Marquis de Lafayette lands near Charleston, South Carolina, in order to help the Continental Congress to train its army.
1805 – Lewis and Clark Expedition: Scouting ahead of the expedition, Meriwether Lewis and four companions sight the Great Falls of the Missouri River.
1855 – Twentieth opera of Giuseppe Verdi, Les vêpres siciliennes ("The Sicilian Vespers"), is premiered in Paris. 
1881 – The USS Jeannette is crushed in an Arctic Ocean ice pack.
1886 – A fire devastates much of Vancouver, British Columbia.
1893 – Grover Cleveland notices a rough spot in his mouth and on July 1 undergoes secret, successful surgery to remove a large, cancerous portion of his jaw; the operation was not revealed to the public until 1917, nine years after the president's death.
1895 – Émile Levassor wins the world's first real automobile race. Levassor completed the 732-mile course, from Paris to Bordeaux and back, in just under 49 hours, at a then-impressive speed of about 15 miles per hour. 
1898 – Yukon Territory is formed, with Dawson chosen as its capital.

1901–present
1917 – World War I: The deadliest German air raid on London of the war is carried out by Gotha G.IV bombers and results in 162 deaths, including 46 children, and 432 injuries. 
1927 – Aviator Charles Lindbergh receives a ticker tape parade up 5th Avenue in New York City.
1944 – World War II: The Battle of Villers-Bocage:  German tank ace Michael Wittmann ambushes elements of the British 7th Armoured Division, destroying up to fourteen tanks, fifteen personnel carriers and two anti-tank guns in a Tiger I tank.
  1944   – World War II: German combat elements, reinforced by the 17th SS Panzergrenadier Division, launch a counterattack on American forces near Carentan.
  1944   – World War II: Germany launches the first V1 Flying Bomb attack on England. Only four of the eleven bombs strike their targets.
1952 – Catalina affair: A Swedish Douglas DC-3 is shot down by a Soviet MiG-15 fighter.
1966 – The United States Supreme Court rules in Miranda v. Arizona that the police must inform suspects of their Fifth Amendment rights before questioning them (colloquially known as "Mirandizing").
1967 – U.S. President Lyndon B. Johnson nominates Solicitor-General Thurgood Marshall to become the first black justice on the U.S. Supreme Court.
1971 – Vietnam War: The New York Times begins publication of the Pentagon Papers.
1973 – In a game versus the Philadelphia Phillies at Veterans Stadium, Steve Garvey, Davey Lopes, Ron Cey and Bill Russell play together as an infield for the first time, going on to set the record of staying together for  years.
1977 – Convicted Martin Luther King Jr. assassin James Earl Ray is recaptured after escaping from prison three days before.
  1977 – The Uphaar Cinema Fire took place at Green Park, Delhi, resulting in the deaths of 59 people and seriously injured 103 others.
1981 – At the Trooping the Colour ceremony in London, a teenager, Marcus Sarjeant, fires six blank shots at Queen Elizabeth II.
1982 – Fahd becomes King of Saudi Arabia upon the death of his brother, Khalid.
  1982 – Battles of Tumbledown and Wireless Ridge, during the Falklands War.
1983 – Pioneer 10 becomes the first man-made object to leave the central Solar System when it passes beyond the orbit of Neptune.
1990 – First day of the June 1990 Mineriad in Romania. At least 240 strikers and students are arrested or killed in the chaos ensuing from the first post-Ceaușescu elections.
1994 – A jury in Anchorage, Alaska, blames recklessness by Exxon and Captain Joseph Hazelwood for the Exxon Valdez disaster, allowing victims of the oil spill to seek $15 billion in damages.
1996 – The Montana Freemen surrender after an 81-day standoff with FBI agents.
  1996   – Garuda Indonesia flight 865 crashes during takeoff from Fukuoka Airport, killing three people and injuring 170.
1997 – A jury sentences Timothy McVeigh to death for his part in the 1995 Oklahoma City bombing.
1999 – BMW win the 24 Hours of Le Mans, with Toyota being a contention for the win until a puncture in the last hour relegated it to second, Toyota not participating in Le Mans again until 2012. The race was also remembered for the flipping incidents involving the Mercedes cars, the team withdrawing mid-race and Mercedes never entering Le Mans again.
2000 – President Kim Dae-jung of South Korea meets Kim Jong-il, leader of North Korea, for the beginning of the first ever inter-Korea summit, in the northern capital of Pyongyang.
  2000   – Italy pardons Mehmet Ali Ağca, the Turkish gunman who tried to kill Pope John Paul II in 1981.
2002 – The United States withdraws from the Anti-Ballistic Missile Treaty.
2005 – The jury acquits pop singer Michael Jackson of his charges for allegedly sexually molesting a child in 1993.
2007 – The Al Askari Mosque is bombed for a second time.
2010 – A capsule of the Japanese spacecraft Hayabusa, containing particles of the asteroid 25143 Itokawa, returns to Earth by landing in the Australian Outback.
2012 – A series of bombings across Iraq, including Baghdad, Hillah and Kirkuk, kills at least 93 people and wounds over 300 others.
2015 – A man opens fire at policemen outside the police headquarters in Dallas, Texas, while a bag containing a pipe bomb is also found. He was later shot dead by police.
2018 – Volkswagen is fined one billion euros over the emissions scandal.
2021 – A gas explosion in Zhangwan district of Shiyan city, in Hubei province of China kills at least 12 people and wounds over 138 others.

Births

Pre-1600
AD 40 – Gnaeus Julius Agricola, Roman general (d. 93)
 823 – Charles the Bald, Holy Roman Emperor (d. 877)
 839 – Charles the Fat, Holy Roman Emperor (d. 888)
1367 – Taejong of Joseon (d. 1422)
1500 – Ernest of Bavaria, pledge lord of the County of Glatz (d. 1560)
1508 – Alessandro Piccolomini, Italian astronomer and philosopher (d. 1579)
1539 – Jost Amman, Swiss printmaker (d. 1591)
1555 – Giovanni Antonio Magini, Italian mathematician, cartographer and astronomer (d. 1617)
1580 – Willebrord Snell, Dutch astronomer and mathematician (d. 1626)
1595 – Jan Marek Marci, Czech physician and scientist (d. 1667)

1601–1900
1617 – Sir Vincent Corbet, 1st Baronet, English politician (d. 1656)
1649 – Adrien Baillet, French scholar and critic (d. 1706)
1711 – Sir Richard Glyn, 1st Baronet, of Ewell, English banker and politician, Lord Mayor of London (d. 1773)
1752 – Frances Burney, English novelist and playwright (d. 1840)
1761 – Antonín Vranický, Czech violinist and composer (d. 1820)
1763 – José Bonifácio de Andrada, Brazilian poet, academic, and politician (d. 1838)
1773 – Thomas Young, English physicist and physiologist (d. 1829)
1775 – Antoni Radziwiłł, Polish-Lithuanian composer and politician (d. 1833)
1786 – Winfield Scott, American general (d. 1866)
1790 – José Antonio Páez, Venezuelan general and politician, President of Venezuela (d. 1873)
1809 – Heinrich Hoffmann, German psychiatrist and author (d. 1894)
1822 – Carl Schmidt, Latvian-German chemist and academic (d. 1894)
1827 – Alberto Henschel, German-Brazilian photographer and businessman (d. 1882)
1831 – James Clerk Maxwell, Scottish physicist and mathematician (d. 1879)
1840 – Augusta Lundin, the first international Swedish fashion designer (d. 1919)
1854 – Charles Algernon Parsons, English engineer, founded C. A. Parsons and Company (d. 1931)
1863 – Lucy, Lady Duff-Gordon, English fashion designer (d. 1935)
1864 – Rudolf Kjellén, Swedish political scientist and academic (d. 1922)
  1864   – Dwight B. Waldo, American historian and academic (d. 1939)
1865 – Karl Blossfeldt, German photographer (d. 1932)
  1865   – W. B. Yeats, Irish poet and playwright, Nobel Prize laureate (d. 1939)
1868 – Wallace Clement Sabine, American physicist and academic (d. 1919)
1870 – Jules Bordet, Belgian immunologist and microbiologist, Nobel Prize laureate (d. 1961)
1872 – Thomas N. Heffron, American actor, director, and screenwriter (d. 1951)
1873 – Karin Swanström, Swedish actress, director, and producer (d. 1942)
1875 – Paul Neumann, Austrian swimmer and physician (d. 1932)
1876 – William Sealy Gosset, English chemist and statistician (d. 1937)
1879 – Heinrich Gutkin, Estonian businessman and politician (d. 1941)
  1879   – Charalambos Tseroulis, Greek general and politician, Greek Minister for Military Affairs (d. 1929)
1884 – Leon Chwistek, Polish painter, philosopher, and mathematician (d. 1944)
  1884   – Étienne Gilson, French philosopher and academic (d. 1978)
1885 – Henry George Lamond, Australian farmer and author (d. 1969)
1887 – André François-Poncet, French politician and diplomat (d. 1978)
  1887   – Bruno Frank, German-American author, poet, and playwright (d. 1945)
1888 – Fernando Pessoa, Portuguese poet and critic (d. 1935)
1892 – Basil Rathbone, South African-born British-American actor (d. 1967)
1893 – Alan Arnold Griffith, English engineer (d. 1963)
  1893   – Dorothy L. Sayers, English author and poet (d. 1957)
1894 – Leo Kanner, Ukrainian-American psychiatrist and physician (d. 1981)
  1894   – Jacques Henri Lartigue, French photographer and painter (d. 1986)
1897 – Paavo Nurmi, Finnish runner and coach (d. 1973)
1899 – Carlos Chávez, Mexican composer, conductor, and journalist, founded the Mexican Symphonic Orchestra (d. 1978)

1901–present
1901 – Tage Erlander, Swedish lieutenant and politician, 25th Prime Minister of Sweden (d. 1985)
1902 – Carolyn Eisele, American mathematician and historian (d. 2000)
1903 – Willard Harrison Bennett, American physicist and chemist (d. 1987)
1905 – James T. Rutnam, Sri Lankan historian and author (d. 1988)
1906 – Bruno de Finetti, Austrian-Italian mathematician and statistician (d. 1985)
1909 – E. M. S. Namboodiripad, Indian theorist and politician, 1st Chief Minister of Kerala (d. 1998)
1910 – Gonzalo Torrente Ballester, Spanish journalist, author, and playwright (d. 1999)
  1910   – Mary Wickes, American actress (d. 1995)
  1910   – Mary Whitehouse, English activist, founded the National Viewers' and Listeners' Association (d. 2001)
1911 – Luis Walter Alvarez, American physicist and academic, Nobel Prize laureate (d. 1988)
  1911   – Maurice Copeland, American actor (d. 1985)
  1911   – Erwin Wilhelm Müller, German physicist and academic (d. 1977)
1912 – Hector de Saint-Denys Garneau, Canadian poet and painter (d. 1943)
1913 – Ralph Edwards, American radio and television host (d. 2005)
  1913   – Yitzhak Pundak, Israeli general, diplomat and politician (d. 2017)
1914 – Frederic Franklin, English-American ballet dancer and director (d. 2013)
1915 – Don Budge, American tennis player and coach (d. 2000)
1916 – Wu Zhengyi, Chinese botanist and academic (d. 2013)
1917 – Teddy Turner, English actor (d. 1992)
  1917   – Augusto Roa Bastos, Paraguayan novelist (d. 2005)
1918 – Ben Johnson, American actor and stuntman (d. 1996)
  1918   – Helmut Lent, German soldier and pilot (d. 1944)
  1918   – Percy Rodriguez, Canadian-American actor (d. 2007)
1920 – Rolf Huisgen, German chemist and academic (d. 2020)
  1920   – Iosif Vorovich, Russian mathematician and engineer (d. 2001)
1921 – Lennart Strand, Swedish runner (d. 2004)
1922 – Etienne Leroux, South African author (d. 1989)
1923 – Lloyd Conover, American chemist and inventor (d. 2017)
1925 – Kristine Miller, American actress (d. 2015)
1926 – Jérôme Lejeune, French pediatrician and geneticist (d. 1994)
  1926   – Paul Lynde, American actor and comedian (d. 1982)
1927 – Slim Dusty, Australian singer-songwriter and guitarist (d. 2003)
1928 – Giacomo Biffi, Italian cardinal (d. 2015)
  1928   – Renée Morisset, Canadian pianist (d. 2009)
  1928   – John Forbes Nash, Jr., American mathematician and academic, Nobel Prize laureate (d. 2015)
1929 – Ralph McQuarrie, American illustrator (d. 2012)
  1929   – Robert W. Scott, American farmer and politician, 67th Governor of North Carolina (d. 2009)
1930 – Gotthard Graubner, German painter and educator (d. 2013)
  1930   – Ryszard Kukliński, Polish colonel and spy (d. 2004)
  1930   – Paul Veyne, French archaeologist, historian, and academic
1931 – Nora Kovach, Hungarian-American ballerina (d. 2009)
  1931   – Reed Scowen, Canadian politician (d. 2020)
  1931   – Irvin D. Yalom, American psychotherapist and academic
1932 – Raymond Jolliffe, 5th Baron Hylton, English politician
  1932   – Bob McGrath, American singer and actor (d. 2022)
  1932   – Billy Williams, American baseball player and coach (d. 2013)
1933 – Tom King, Baron King of Bridgwater, English soldier and politician, Secretary of State for Defence
  1933   – Norman Lloyd-Edwards, Welsh lawyer and politician, Lord Lieutenant of South Glamorgan
1934 – Bill Blakeley, American basketball player and coach (d. 2010)
  1934   – Lucjan Brychczy, Polish footballer and coach
  1934   – Manuel Clouthier, Mexican businessman and politician (d. 1989)
  1934   – James Anthony Griffin, American bishop
  1934   – Uriel Jones, American drummer (d. 2009)
  1934   – Leonard Kleinrock, American computer scientist and engineer
1935 – Christo, Bulgarian-French sculptor and painter (d. 2020)
  1935   – Jeanne-Claude, Moroccan sculptor and painter (d. 2009)
  1935   – Samak Sundaravej, Thai politician, 25th Prime Minister of Thailand (d. 2009)
1937 – Eleanor Holmes Norton, American lawyer and politician
  1937   – Erich Ribbeck, German footballer and manager
  1937   – Andreas Whittam Smith, English journalist and publisher, co-founded The Independent
1940 – Bobby Freeman, American singer-songwriter, pianist, and producer (d. 2017)
  1940   – Dallas Long, American shot putter and physician
1941 – Marcel Lachemann, American baseball player, coach, and manager
  1941   – Serge Lemoyne, Canadian painter (d. 1998)
  1941   – Marv Tarplin, American guitarist and songwriter (d. 2011)
1942 – Yiannis Boutaris, Greek businessman and politician, Mayor of Thessaloniki
1943 – Harry Collins, English sociologist, author, and academic
  1943   – Malcolm McDowell, English actor and producer
  1943   – Jim Guy Tucker,  American lawyer and politician, 43rd Governor of Arkansas
1944 – Christine Beasley, English nursing administrator
  1944   – David Curry, English journalist and politician, Secretary of State for Communities and Local Government
  1944   – Ban Ki-moon, South Korean politician and diplomat, 8th Secretary-General of the United Nations
1945 – Whitley Strieber, American author
1946 – Sher Bahadur Deuba, Nepalese politician, 32nd Prime Minister of Nepal
  1946   – Paul L. Modrich, American biochemist and academic, Nobel Prize laureate
  1946   – Gabriel of Komana, Belgian-Dutch archbishop (d. 2013)
1948 – Garnet Bailey, Canadian-American ice hockey player and scout (d. 2001)
  1948   – Joe Roth, American director and producer, co-founded Morgan Creek Productions
1949 – Ann Druyan, American popular science writer
  1949   – Dennis Locorriere, American singer and musician
  1949   – Ulla Schmidt, German educator and politician, German Federal Minister of Health
  1949   – Red Symons, English-Australian musician, television, and radio personality
1950 – Nick Brown, English politician, Minister of Agriculture, Fisheries and Food
  1950   – Gerd Zewe, German footballer and manager
1951 – Howard Leese, American guitarist and producer
  1951   – Richard Thomas, American actor, director, and producer
  1951   – Stellan Skarsgård, Swedish actor 
1952 – Jean-Marie Dedecker, Belgian martial artist and politician
1953 – Tim Allen, American actor, comedian, and producer
1954 – Andrzej Lepper, Polish politician, Deputy Prime Minister of the Republic of Poland (d. 2011)
  1954   – Ngozi Okonjo-Iweala, Nigerian economist and politician, Minister of Foreign Affairs for Nigeria
1955 – Alan Hansen, Scottish footballer and sportscaster
  1955   – Leah Ward Sears, German-American lawyer and jurist
1956 – Blair Chapman, Canadian ice hockey player
  1956   – Sal Paolantonio, American lieutenant and journalist
1957 – Ron Areshenkoff, Canadian ice hockey player (d. 2019)
  1957   – Roy Cooper, American lawyer and politician, 75th Governor of North Carolina
  1957   – Bruce Flowers,  American basketball player
  1957   – Andrzej Morozowski, Polish journalist and author
  1957   – Dicky Thompson, American golfer
1959 – Boyko Borissov, Bulgarian footballer and politician, 50th Prime Minister of Bulgaria
  1959   – Maurice G. Dantec, French-born Canadian science fiction writer (d. 2016)
  1959   – Steve Georganas, Australian politician
  1959   – Klaus Iohannis, Romanian educator and politician, 5th President of Romania
1960 – Jacques Rougeau, Canadian wrestler
1962 – Davey Hamilton, American race car driver
  1962   – Glenn Michibata, Canadian-American tennis player and coach
  1962   – Ally Sheedy, American actress and author
  1962   – Hannah Storm, American journalist and author
1963 – Bettina Bunge, Swiss-German tennis player
  1963   – Sarah Connolly, English soprano and actress
  1963   – Audrey Niffenegger, American author and academic
1964 – Christian Wilhelm Berger, Romanian organist, composer, and educator
  1964   – Kathy Burke, English actress, director, and playwright
  1964   – Piyush Goyal, Indian politician, Minister of Railways
  1964   – Šarūnas Marčiulionis, Lithuanian basketball player
1965 – Infanta Cristina Federica of Spain
  1965   – Vassilis Karapialis, Greek footballer
  1965   – Lukas Ligeti, Austrian-American drummer and composer
  1965   – Maninder Singh, Indian cricketer
1966 – Henry Bond, English photographer and curator
  1966   – Grigori Perelman, Russian mathematician
  1966   – Naoki Hattori, Japanese race car driver
1967 – Taşkın Aksoy, German-Turkish footballer and manager
1968 – Fabio Baldato, Italian cyclist
  1968   – Peter DeBoer, Canadian ice hockey player and coach
  1968   – Darren Dreger, Canadian sportscaster
  1968   – David Gray, English-Welsh singer-songwriter, guitarist, and producer
  1968   – Tim Leveque, Canadian ice hockey player
  1968   – Denise Pearson, English singer-songwriter 
  1968   – Marcel Theroux, Ugandan-English journalist and author
1969 – Cayetana Guillén Cuervo, Spanish actress, director, and screenwriter
  1969   – Virginie Despentes, French author, screenwriter, and director
  1969   – Laura Kightlinger, American actress, comedian, producer, and screenwriter
  1969   – Svetlana Krivelyova, Russian shot putter
  1969   – Søren Rasted, Danish singer-songwriter, guitarist, and producer
1970 – Rivers Cuomo, American rock musician
  1970   – Chris Cairns, New Zealand cricketer
1971 – Nóra Köves, Hungarian tennis player
1972 – Natalie MacMaster, Canadian fiddler
  1972   – Marek Jerzy Minakowski, Polish philosopher, historian, genealogist
1973 – Sam Adams, American football player
  1973   – Tanner Foust, American race car driver and television host
  1973   – Mattias Hellberg, Swedish singer-songwriter 
  1973   – Stuart Karppinen, Australian cricketer and coach
  1973   – Ville Laihiala, Finnish singer-songwriter and guitarist 
1974 – Valeri Bure, Russian-American ice hockey player
1975 – Ante Covic, Australian footballer
  1975   – Jeff Davis, American screenwriter and producer
  1975   – Jennifer Nicole Lee, American model, actress, and author
  1975   – Jaan Pehk, Estonian singer-songwriter and guitarist 
  1975   – Riccardo Scimeca, English footballer
1976 – Kym Marsh, English singer-songwriter and actress 
1977 – Romain Mesnil, French pole vaulter
  1977   – Earthwind Moreland, American football player
1978 – Ethan Embry, American actor
1979 – Esther Anderson, Australian actress
  1979   – Nila Håkedal, Norwegian volleyball player
  1979   – Miguel Pate, American long jumper
  1979   – Ryan Pickett, American director, producer, and screenwriter
1980 – Florent Malouda, French footballer
  1980   – Diego Mendieta, Paraguayan footballer (d. 2012)
  1980   – Jamario Moon, American basketball player
  1980   – Juan Carlos Navarro, Spanish basketball player
  1980   – Darius Vassell, English footballer
  1980   – Markus Winkelhock, German racing driver
1981 – Chris Evans, American actor and producer
  1981   – Blake Judd, American actor, director, and producer
  1981   – David Madden, founder and executive director of the National History Bee and the National History Bowl
  1981   – Radim Vrbata, Czech ice hockey player
1982 – Kenenisa Bekele, Ethiopian runner
  1982   – Krzysztof Bosak, Polish politician
  1982   – Nate Jones, American football player
1983 – Steve Novak, American basketball player
  1983   – Jason Spezza, Canadian ice hockey player
  1983   – Rachel Taylor, Welsh rugby union player
1984 – Nery Castillo, Mexican-Uruguayan footballer
  1984   – Kaori Icho, Japanese wrestler
  1984   – Antje Möldner-Schmidt, German runner
1985 – Filipe Albuquerque, Portuguese racing driver
  1985   – Silvio Bankert, German footballer
  1985   – Pedro Strop, Dominican baseball player
  1985   – Danny Syvret, Canadian ice hockey player
1986 – Kat Dennings, American actress and comedian
  1986   – Keisuke Honda, Japanese footballer 
  1986   – Jonathan Lucroy, American baseball catcher
  1986   – Ashley Olsen, American child actress, fashion designer, and businesswoman
  1986   – Mary-Kate Olsen, American child actress, fashion designer, and businesswoman
  1986   – DJ Snake, French DJ and record producer
  1986   – Lea Verou, Greek computer scientist and author
  1986   – Måns Zelmerlöw, Swedish singer
1987 – Marko Grgić, Croatian footballer
1988 – Gabe Carimi, American football player
  1988   – Reece Noi, British actor
  1988   – Cody Walker, American actor
1989 – Ben Barba, Australian rugby league player
  1989   – James Calado, English racing driver
  1989   – Ryan McDonagh, American ice hockey defenseman
  1989   – Daniel Mortimer, Australian rugby league player
  1989   – Andreas Samaris, Greek footballer
  1989   – Tommy Searle, English motocross racer
  1989   – Hassan Whiteside, American basketball player
  1989   – Erica Wiebe, Canadian wrestler
1990 – James McCann, American baseball player
  1990   – Nicole Riner, Swiss tennis player
  1990   – Aaron Taylor-Johnson, English actor
1991 – Will Claye, American jumper
  1991   – Ryan Mason, English footballer
1992 – Semi Radradra, Fijian rugby league player
1993 – Simona Senoner, Italian ski jumper (d. 2011)
  1993   – Denis Ten, Kazakhstani figure skater (d. 2018)
1994 – Deepika Kumari, Indian archer
1995 – Emily Fanning, New Zealand tennis player
  1995   – Laura Ucrós, Colombian tennis player
2000 – Penny Oleksiak, Canadian swimmer

Deaths

Pre-1600
 220 – Xiahou Dun, Chinese general
 976 – Mansur I, Samanid emir
 995 – Fujiwara no Michikane, Japanese nobleman (b. 961)
1036 – Ali az-Zahir, Fatimid caliph (b. 1005)
1231 – Anthony of Padua, Portuguese priest and saint (b. 1195)
1256 – Tankei, Japanese sculptor (b. 1173)
1348 – Juan Manuel, Spanish prince (b. 1282)
1432 – Uko Fockena, Frisian chieftain (b. c. 1408)
1550 – Veronica Gambara, Italian poet (b. 1485)

1601–1900
1636 – George Gordon, 1st Marquess of Huntly, Scottish politician (b. 1562)
1645 – Miyamoto Musashi, Japanese samurai (b. 1584)
1661 – Henry Carey, 2nd Earl of Monmouth, English politician (b. 1595)
1665 – Egbert Bartholomeusz Kortenaer, Dutch admiral (b. 1604)
1762 – Dorothea Erxleben, first German female doctor (b. 1715)
1784 – Henry Middleton, American farmer and politician, 2nd President of the Continental Congress (b. 1717)
1846 – Jean-Baptiste Benoît Eyriès, French geographer and author (b. 1767)
1861 – Henry Gray, English anatomist and surgeon (b. 1827)
1881 – Joseph Škoda, Czech physician and dermatologist (b. 1805)
1886 – Ludwig II, king of Bavaria (b. 1845)
1894 – John Cox Bray, Australian politician, 15th Premier of South Australia (b. 1842)
1898 – Joseph-Adolphe Chapleau, Canadian lawyer and politician, 5th Premier of Quebec (b. 1840)

1901–present
1904 – Nikiforos Lytras, Greek painter and educator (b. 1832)
1917 – Louis-Philippe Hébert, Canadian sculptor (b. 1850)
1918 – Michael Alexandrovich, Russian Grand Duke (b. 1878) 
1930 – Henry Segrave, American-English racing driver (b. 1896)
1931 – Kitasato Shibasaburō, Japanese physician and bacteriologist (b. 1851)
1939 – Arthur Coningham, Australian cricketer (b. 1863)
1943 – Kočo Racin, Macedonian author and activist (b. 1908)
1948 – Osamu Dazai, Japanese author (b. 1909)
1951 – Ben Chifley, Australian engineer and politician, 16th Prime Minister of Australia (b. 1885)
1957 – Irving Baxter, American high jumper and pole vaulter (b. 1876)
1958 – Edwin Keppel Bennett, English poet and academic (b. 1887)
1965 – Martin Buber, Austrian-Israeli philosopher and theologian (b. 1878)
  1965   – David Drummond, Australian farmer and politician (b. 1890)
1969 – Pralhad Keshav Atre, Indian journalist, director, and producer (b. 1898)
1972 – Georg von Békésy, Hungarian biophysicist and academic, Nobel Prize laureate (b. 1899)
  1972   – Stephanie von Hohenlohe, Austrian-German spy (b. 1891)
1979 – Demetrio Stratos, Egyptian-Italian singer-songwriter and pianist (b. 1945)
1980 – Walter Rodney, Guyanese historian and activist (b. 1942)
1981 – Olivério Pinto, Brazilian zoologist and physician (b. 1896)
1984 – António Variações, Portuguese singer-songwriter (b. 1944)
1986 – Benny Goodman, American clarinet player, songwriter, and bandleader (b. 1909)
1987 – Geraldine Page, American actress (b. 1924)
1989 – Fran Allison, American television personality and puppeteer (b. 1907)
1993 – Gérard Côté, Canadian runner (b. 1913)
  1993   – Deke Slayton, American soldier, pilot, and astronaut (b. 1924)
1994 – Nadia Gray, Romanian-French actress (b. 1923)
1997 – Nguyen Manh Tuong, Vietnamese lawyer and academic (b. 1909)
1998 – Alfred Gerrard, English sculptor and academic (b. 1899)
  1998   – Birger Ruud, Norwegian ski jumper (b. 1911)
  1998   – Reg Smythe, English cartoonist  (b. 1917)
2002 – John Hope, American navigator and meteorologist (b. 1919)
  2002   – Maia Wojciechowska, Polish-American author (b. 1927)
2003 – Malik Meraj Khalid, Pakistani lawyer and politician, Prime Minister of Pakistan (b. 1916)
2004 – Ralph Wiley, American journalist and author (b. 1952)
2005 – Álvaro Cunhal, Portuguese academic and politician (b. 1913)
  2005   – David Diamond, American pianist and composer (b. 1915)
2006 – Charles Haughey, Irish lawyer and politician, 7th Taoiseach of Ireland (b. 1925)
2007 – Walid Eido, Lebanese judge and politician (b. 1942)
2008 – Tim Russert, American journalist and lawyer (b. 1950)
2009 – Fathi Yakan, Lebanese scholar and politician (b. 1933)
2010 – Jimmy Dean, American singer and businessman, founded Jimmy Dean Foods (b. 1928)
2012 – Sam Beddingfield, American pilot and engineer (b. 1933)
  2012   – Graeme Bell, Australian pianist, composer, and bandleader (b. 1914)
  2012   – Roger Garaudy, French philosopher and author (b. 1913)
  2012   – Jože Humer, Slovenian composer and translator (b. 1934)
  2012   – Mehdi Hassan, Pakistani ghazal singer and playback singer for Lollywood (b. 1927)
2013 – David Deutsch, American businessman, founded Deutsch Inc. (b. 1929)
  2013   – Sam Most, American flute player and saxophonist (b. 1930)
  2013   – Albert White Hat, American educator and activist (b. 1938)
2014 – Mahdi Elmandjra, Moroccan economist and sociologist (b. 1933)
  2014   – Gyula Grosics, Hungarian footballer and manager (b. 1926)
  2014   – Jim Keays, Scottish-Australian singer-songwriter and guitarist (b. 1946)
  2014   – Chuck Noll, American football player and coach (b. 1932)
  2014   – Robert Peters, American poet, playwright, and critic (b. 1924)
2015 – Buddy Boudreaux, American saxophonist and clarinet player (b. 1917)
  2015   – Sergio Renán, Argentinian actor, director, and screenwriter (b. 1933)
  2015   – Mike Shrimpton, New Zealand cricketer and coach (b. 1940)
2021 – Ned Beatty, American actor (b. 1937)

Holidays and observances
 Christian feast day:
 Anthony of Padua, Doctor of the Church
 Aquilina
 Cetteus (Peregrinus)
 Felicula
 G. K. Chesterton (Episcopal Church (USA)) 
 Gerard of Clairvaux
 Psalmodius
 Ragnebert (Rambert)
 Blessed Thomas Woodhouse
 Triphyllius
 June 13 (Eastern Orthodox liturgics)
Inventors' Day (Hungary)
Suleimaniah City Fallen and Martyrs Day (Iraqi Kurdistan)
International Albinism Awareness Day (international)

References

External links

 
 
 

Days of the year
June